LIM domain-binding protein 1 is a protein that in humans is encoded by the LDB1 gene.

Interactions
LDB1 has been shown to interact with LMO4, TCF3, TAL1 and CBFA2T3.

References

Further reading